Unspeakable Sentences: Narration and Representation in the Language of Fiction is a study of sentences in free indirect speech and its limitations, published in 1982 by American literary expert and linguist Ann Banfield.

Further reading 
 Christine Brooke-Rose: "Ill locutions",  in: Poetics Today 11 (1990), S. 283–293, also included in: Stories, theories and things, Cambridge University Press, Cambridge 1991, S. 63–80.

External links

English grammar books